Sir Murray Stuart-Smith, KCMG, PC (born 18 November 1927) is a former English barrister and Appeal Court judge. His 1997 re-examination of Lord Taylor's report into the Hillsborough disaster is seen today as a "debacle".

Early life
Stuart-Smith was educated at Radley College and at Corpus Christi College, Cambridge.

Stuart-Smith was called to the bar by Gray's Inn in 1952 and was made a Bencher 1978. He was appointed Queen's Counsel in 1970, and as judge of the High Court of Justice (Queen's Bench Division) in 1981. He was appointed to the Court of Appeal in 1987, and retired in 2000. He later served as President of the Court of Appeal of Gibraltar from 2007, and as Justice of the Court of Appeal of Bermuda from 2004.

Hillsborough Report
In retirement Sir Murray was appointed to re-examine Lord Taylor's report into the Hillsborough disaster, together with the wider question of whether the inquest process had been satisfactory. Sir Murray broadly concluded that there were no problems with the way that the inquiry had been handled. Lord Falconer later stated "I am absolutely sure that Sir Murray Stuart-Smith came completely to the wrong conclusion". Falconer added: "It made the families in the Hillsborough disaster feel after one establishment cover-up, here was another."

There was massive criticism of the Stuart-Smith inquiry, including outrage after the judge quipped during a meeting with families: “Have you got a few of your people or are they like the Liverpool fans, turn up at the last minute?”

Criminologist Professor Phil Scraton has remained highly critical of the Stuart-Smith scrutiny, describing it as a "debacle". Speaking in October 2012, Scraton said the findings of the Hillsborough Independent Panel – which disclosed that 41 of the 96 who died had the potential to survive had there been a more effective response to the emergency – showed "just how wrong he (LJ Stuart-Smith) was."

Judgments
Notable judicial decisions of Stuart-Smith include:

Johnstone v Bloomsbury HA [1992] QB 333, [1991] 2 WLR 1362, [1991] 2 All ER 293, an English contract law case, concerning implied terms and unfair terms under the Unfair Contract Terms Act 1977.
 Midland Bank plc v Cooke [1995] 4 All ER 562, constructive trusts.
 Smith v Lloyds TSB Group plc [2001] QB 541, liability of a bank on a forged cheque.
 , another case on the Unfair Contract Terms Act 1977.
 , part payments of debt.

Family
Sir Murray is the father of Jeremy Stuart-Smith, also a judge, and the landscape architect and garden designer Tom Stuart-Smith.

Footnotes

1927 births
Alumni of Corpus Christi College, Cambridge
20th-century English judges
Knights Bachelor
Knights Commander of the Order of St Michael and St George
People educated at Radley College
Living people
Lords Justices of Appeal
Members of the Privy Council of the United Kingdom
Expatriate judges on the courts of Bermuda